Bee rustling is a crime involving the theft of honey bees. It has been reported in Western Canada and the Western United States, as with cattle rustling, also in the United Kingdom. A 2014 theft in California was valued at $65,000 and a December 2016 theft of 300 bee colonies in Texas was valued at $90,000. Bees and honey worth $100,000 were stolen from a farm in Abbotsford, British Columbia in 2012. The California State Beekeepers Association offers a $10,000 reward for information resulting in the arrest and conviction of a bee rustler.

Modern Farmer, The Guardian and others ascribe the increase in this crime to higher honeybee values after the colony collapse disorder since 2006.

See also
Horse theft

References

Bees
Animal theft